The Asia-Pacific Peace Research Association is the Regional Association of International Peace Research Association- IPRA. It is an international non-governmental organization of peace researchers, peace educators and peace advocates.

The Asian Peace Research Association was established on 5 December 1980, at the closing of the conference on Asian Peace Research in the Global Context held in Yokohama, Japan. The name was changed to the current name, Asia-Pacific Peace Research Association (APPRA), on 4 February 1992, during a regional conference organized by the association held at the University of Canterbury, Christchurch, New Zealand.

Prof. John P. Synott of Queensland University of Technology is currently the convener of APPRA.

Orientation 
The distinctive orientation of APPRA is towards building societies of peace and justice. Basic to this mission is a comprehensive understanding of peace which means not only the absence of war and conflict but above all the presence of essential conditions for the well-being of humanity.

References

Peace organisations based in Australia